A Lot Like Birds was an American post-hardcore band formed in Sacramento, California. The band released four albums and received considerable media attention from music sites. Since the release of 2011's Conversation Piece, A Lot Like Birds signed to Equal Vision Records and released their third studio album on October 29, 2013. The band announced their final show on their Facebook page on February 17, 2018.

History

Formation and Plan B (2009–2010)
The band formed in Sacramento when guitarist/vocalist Michael Franzino invited local musicians to collaborate on an album. The result was A Lot Like Birds's debut album Plan B. Released in 2009, the album was largely instrumental and experimental, featuring horns, strings, and guest vocals in addition to screamed vocals and post-hardcore arrangements. It has been widely distributed for free online by the band.

Following the album's release, A Lot Like Birds formed a core around five of the musicians involved: Franzino and Ben Wiacek (Vegan Discharge) on guitar, Michael Littlefield on bass, Joe Arrington on drums, and Cory Lockwood (Vegan Discharge) on vocals. The other musicians that appeared on the album would appear at live shows as guest performers, and the band took to describing themselves as a "5-8 piece" outfit.

Addition of Kurt Travis and Conversation Piece (2011)
In January 2011, A Lot Like Birds confirmed that singer Kurt Travis would be joining the band, after the information had already leaked online. Travis, who had previously fronted Dance Gavin Dance, had originally planned to collaborate with A Lot Like Birds for a track, but decided to join after seeing how well he and the band fit together.

Travis soon formed a connection at Doghouse Records, and in April A Lot Like Birds announced that they had signed to the label, despite not having any music to showcase beyond Plan B. The first demo recorded with Kurt Travis was for the song "Tantrum (Far from the Tree, the Apple Grew Rotten)", an eight-minute, uncommonly structured song that leaked onto the internet in March, before the signing was announced.

Having generated a steady buzz, A Lot Like Birds released their second album, Conversation Piece, to much anticipation on October 11. With more focus on vocals than on their first album, Conversation Piece was also less experimental and more focused on post-hardcore elements. The release was generally well received by fans of the genre. With their second album under their belt, the band set out on their first national tour with Just Like Vinyl and Dance Gavin Dance.

Signing to Equal Vision and No Place (2012–2014)
On August 8, 2012, it was announced that A Lot Like Birds had signed to Equal Vision Records. On September 12, 2013, Equal Vision Records and A Lot Like Birds announced that a new album, No Place, would be released on October 29. A new song entitled "Kuroi Ledge" was released on October 4. A music video for the song "Next to Ungodliness" was released on October 25.

No Place debuted at number 199 on the Billboard 200 and number 6 on the Heatseekers Album Chart. The album focuses on the idea of "home" and continues the theme of the group's lyrical focus and use of spoken word in their music. The songs of No Place shine a spotlight on what constitutes a home and the emotional attachments or lack thereof within various rooms of a house.

An animated music video for the song "Connector" was released on January 9, 2014.

DIVISI, side projects and Kurt Travis' departure (2015–2017)
The band announced on February 28, 2015, that bassist Michael Littlefield had left the band. On June 26, 2015, the band announced Matt Coate as their new bassist while on tour, and guitarist Michael Franzino released a debut full-length studio album for his side project, alone. On February 20, 2016, the band announced Kurt Travis' departure from the band. Travis cited a change in the band's direction as his reason for leaving. In Travis's absence, Cory Lockwood took vocal lessons to expand his vocal abilities for the new album, with additional vocals performed by Matt Coate. On March 8, 2017, the band released a teaser video for the album, titled DIVISI. The album was released on May 5, 2017.

Break up (2018)
The band announced on their Facebook page that they will be breaking up following almost ten years together.

Band members

Final Lineup 
 Cory Lockwood – vocals (2009–2018)
 Michael Franzino – lead guitar (2009–2018), vocals (2009–2011)
 Ben Wiacek – rhythm guitar (2009–2018)
 Joseph Arrington – drums (2009–2018)
 Matt Coate - bass guitar (2015–2018), vocals (2016–2018)
Former Band Members
 Juli Lydell – keyboards, backing vocals (2009)
 Matt Sunderland – trumpets, xylophones (2009)
 Tyler Lydell – drums (2009)
 Athena Koumis – violins (2009–2010)
 Michael Littlefield – bass guitar (2009–2015)
 Kurt Travis – vocals (2011–2016)

Timeline

Discography
Studio albums
 Plan B (2009)
 Conversation Piece (2011)
 No Place (2013)
 DIVISI (2017)

Music videos
"Think Dirty Out Loud" (2011)
"Vanity's Fair" (2013)
"Next to Ungodliness" (2013)
"Connector" (2014)
"For Shelley (Unheard)" (2017)
"The Sound of Us" (2017)
"Trace the Lines" (2017)

References

External links

A Lot Like Birds at AllMusic.com

Musical groups from Sacramento, California
Equal Vision Records artists
American screamo musical groups
American post-hardcore musical groups
American emo musical groups
Musical groups established in 2009
Musical groups disestablished in 2018
Doghouse Records artists